Joseph F. Fagan III (September 7, 1941 – August 10, 2013) was an American psychologist and the Lucy Adams Leffingwell Professor of psychology at Case Western Reserve University from 1990 until his death in 2013.

Education
Fagan received his B.A. from the University of Hartford in 1963 and his M.A. and Ph.D. from the University of Connecticut in 1965 and 1967, respectively.

Career
Fagan joined the faculty of Case Western Reserve University in 1968, and became a full professor there ten years later. In 1990, he received the endowed Leffingwell professorship at Case Western, and from 1990 to 1995 he chaired the Department of Psychological Sciences there.

Research
Fagan was known for his research into intelligence testing of infants, and he developed one such test that can predict how successful an infant will be when he or she begins taking classes, as well as another test that he said could predict the likelihood of an infant developing a mental disability by age 3. He also conducted research on the relationship between race and intelligence, and concluded from this research that the black-white IQ gap was due to environmental factors. He also published a number of studies in the early 1980s that found a correlation between novelty preference among infants and their later cognitive test scores. His research has also found a link between infant IQ test scores and academic achievement by age 21. He conducted much of his research along with his wife, Cynthia Holland, a professor of psychology at Cuyahoga Community College.

Death
Fagan died on August 10, 2013 of pancreatic cancer, at the age of 71. In his honor, Case Western created the Joseph F. Fagan, III Award for Research Excellence, which is awarded annually to "a graduate student in the Department of Psychological Sciences who demonstrates a passion and commitment to research excellence."

References

2013 deaths
20th-century American psychologists
Case Western Reserve University faculty
University of Hartford alumni
University of Connecticut alumni
1941 births
Educators from Hartford, Connecticut
Deaths from pancreatic cancer
Intelligence researchers